Tecno Camon 17, Tecno Camon 17P and Tecno Camon 17 Pro are Android-based smartphones manufactured, released and marketed by Tecno Mobile as part of Tecno Camon 17 series. The devices were unveiled during an event held on 6 May 2021 as successors to Tecno Camon 16 series.

The Camon 17, Camon 17P and Camon 17 Pro is an upgraded version of Camon 16 series, coming with different features, including the OS, camera, design and storage. The phone has received generally favorable reviews, with critics mostly noting the bigger battery and fast charging capacity.

Specifications

Hardware
The Camon 17 feature a 720p resolution with an 20:9 aspect ratio, while the Camon 17P and Camon 17 Pro features a 1080p resolution. Camon 17 feature a display size of 6.6-inches, while the Camon 17P and Camon 17 Pro features a display size of 6.8-inches. Camon 17 and Camon17P comes with a MediaTek Helio G85 SoC, while the Camon 17 Pro comes with MediaTek Helio G95 SoC. The Camon 17 comes with 4/6 GB of RAM, the Camon 17P comes with 6 GB of RAM, while the Camon 17 Pro comes with 8 GB of RAM. Camon 17 and Camon 17P comes with 128 GB storage, while Camon 17 Pro comes with 256 GB storage. All of the device feature the ability to use a microSD card to expand the storage to a maximum of 256 GB. All the device come with the battery capacity of 5000 mAh. The Camon 17 and Camon 17P supports fast charging of 18 watt, while the Camon 17 Pro supports fast charging of 25 watt. Camon 17 feature a triple rear camera with a 48-megapixel main camera, 2-megapixel bokeh lens, and an AI sensor, it feature an 8-megapixel front camera. The Camon 17P feature a quad camera with a 64-megapixel main camera, 2-megapixel macro lens, 2-megapixel bokeh lens and an AI sensor, it feature a 16-megapixel front camera. The Camon 17 Pro feature a quad camera with a 64-megapixel main camera, 8-megapixel wide-angle camera, 2-megapixel bokeh and 2-megapixel monochrome sensor, it feature a 48-megapixel front camera. Camon 17 Pro can shoot 4K content at 30fps, 1080p at either 60fps or 30fps and 720p at 30fps.

Software
The device ship with Android 11 with HiOS 7.6, unlike the versions found on Camon 16 series. The HiOS 7.6 features Phone cloner, Document correction and Voice Changer.

Reception 
George Kamau from Techweez gave a positive review of the Camon 17 Pro. Praise was directed towards the display, software and performance, camera and battery, while noting that "TECNO really went all-in with the TECNO Camon 17 Pro". Daniel Anuoluwapelumi Moses from Dignited praised the Camon 17 camera, saying "The Camon 17 camera is really great and seem to be really useful to its users". Segun Akinleye at Techuncode awarded the phone 8 stars out of 10, noting that "The TECNO Camon 17 Pro is a good buy if you are looking for a mid-range device with a strong capacity for hectic activities. It is worth every penny, and most importantly, it packs a lot of intelligent features that can be put to use on the go".

References 

Android (operating system) devices
Tecno smartphones
Mobile phones introduced in 2021